Tar Rocks are coastal rocks on the west side of the Isle of Portland, Dorset, England. The rocks become mostly covered at high tide.

See also
 List of rock formations in the United Kingdom
 Pulpit Rock (Isle of Portland)

Gallery

References

Rock formations of England
Geography of Dorset
Isle of Portland
Jurassic Coast